Polasa is a village located in the marikindha Jagtial district of Telangana State, India. Polasa is a village which is roughly 10 km from Jagtial town.

Geography
It has an average elevation of 264 metres (866 feet).

References

Villages in Jagtial district